The field hockey tournament at the 2006 Asian Games was held from 2 to 14 December 2006 in Al-Rayyan Hockey Field.

In this event, 10 teams participated in men's events and 7 teams participated in women's events.

Medalists

Medal table

Qualification
Top 6 Asian teams, South Korea, India, Pakistan, Japan, China and Malaysia could enter the men's competition directly. For the next four spots a qualification tournament was held in Dhaka, Bangladesh from 11 to 20 May 2006.

Women's qualification tournament was held in Kuala Lumpur, Malaysia from 5 to 9 June 2006. All four teams qualified for the Asian Games but later Pakistan withdrew.

Men

Women

Draw
The teams were distributed according to their position at the FIH World Rankings using the serpentine system for their distribution.

Pool A
 (5)
 (12)
 (14)
 (28)
 (33)

Pool B
 (6)
 (7)
 (19)
 (31)
 (59)

Final standing

Men

Women

References

Men Results
Women Results

External links
Official website

 
Asian Games
2006
2006 Asian Games events
2006 Asian Games